Davey is a masculine given name, frequently a diminutive form (hypocorism) of David. It may refer to:

 Davey Adams, Scottish football goalkeeper from 1903 to 1912
 Davey Allison (1961-1993), American NASCAR race car driver
 Davey Armstrong (born 1956), American retired boxer
 Davey Arthur, Irish folk singer
 Davey Barr (born 1977), Canadian freestyle skier
 Davey Browne (1986-2015), Australian boxer
 Davey Crockett (baseball) (1875–1961), American baseball player and manager
 Davey Graham, British folk guitarist
 Davey Hall (born 1951), British trade unionist
 Davey Holmes (born 1969), American screenwriter, producer and playwright
 Davey Johnson (born 1943), American former Major League Baseball player and manager
 Davey Johnstone (born 1951), Scottish rock guitarist and vocalist
 Davey Lopes (born 1945), American former Major League Baseball player, manager and coach
 Davey Moore (boxer, born 1933) (1933–1963), American featherweight boxer
 Davey Moore (boxer, born 1959) (1959–1988), American middleweight boxer
 Davey O'Brien (1917-1977), American National Football League quarterback
 Davey Payne (born 1944), English saxophonist
 Davey Watt (born 1978), Australian international motorcycle speedway rider
 Davey Whitney (1930-2015), American college basketball head coach
 Davey Williams (1927-2009), American Major League Baseball player
 Davey Williams (musician) (born 1952), American free improvisation and avant-garde music guitarist

Masculine given names
Hypocorisms